The College Historical Society (CHS) – popularly referred to as The Hist – is a debating society at Trinity College Dublin. It was established within the college in 1770 and was inspired by the club formed by the philosopher Edmund Burke during his own time in Trinity in 1747. This makes the Hist the oldest student society in the world.

The society occupies rooms in the Graduates' Memorial Building at Trinity College. Former members have included a number of notable Irish men and women, from republican revolutionaries Theobald Wolfe Tone, Robert Emmet, and Henry Grattan, writers Bram Stoker, Oscar Wilde, and Samuel Beckett, to founding father of the Northern Irish state Edward Carson and first President of Ireland Douglas Hyde, and – in more recent times – Government Ministers like Mary Harney (who was the first female auditor of the society) and Brian Lenihan, and modern Irish authors, such as Sally Rooney and Naoise Dolan.

History

Foundation
The first meeting of the College Historical Society took place on Wednesday 21 March 1770. The society took into its care the minute book of Burke's Club, founded 1747, from which the Hist has since drawn inspiration. Its other precursor was the Historical Club, founded 1753, of which Henry Grattan was a member. James Reid became the first auditor of the Hist later in 1770. It was a time of great change in Ireland and the Western world, at the height of the Enlightenment and before the American War of Independence and the French Revolution. From its inception it showed itself to be at the forefront of intellectual thought in Ireland, and many of its members later went into politics. In 1782, Lawrence Parsons was elected as an MP for  Dublin University at 24, having served as auditor of the Hist just the previous year.

Restrictions and expulsions
Theobald Wolfe Tone, later leader of the United Irishmen, was elected auditor in 1785, and Thomas Addis Emmet was a member of the committee. The society was briefly expelled from the college in 1794, but readmitted on the condition that "No question of modern politics shall be debated". In 1797, the poet Thomas Moore and the nationalist Robert Emmet were elected as members. Eight members of The Hist were expelled in 1798 in the run-up to the Rebellion, and a motion was later carried condemning the rebellion, against their former auditor.

Tension between the society and the college flourished in the early nineteenth century, with the auditor being called before the provost in 1810. In 1812 the provost, Dr Thomas Elrington, objected vehemently to the question ‘Was Brutus justifiable in putting Julius Caesar to death?’. After a number of members were removed at the request of the college board, the society left the college in 1815.

Extern Society
The society continued from 1815 as the Extern Historical Society. Among its members at this time were Isaac Butt, a president of the society who tried unsuccessfully in 1832 to have the society readmitted, Joseph Sheridan LeFanu, Thomas Davis (a president of the society) and John Blake Dillon and many other notables of the nationalist cause. In 1843, under auditor William Connor Magee, future Archbishop of York, the society reformed within the college after a student petition, again on the condition that no subject of current politics was debated. This provision remains in the rules of the society as a nod to the past, but the college authorities have long since ceased to restrict the subjects of the society's debates.

19th century
The society continued successfully after that with many lively debates, including the motion on June 10, 1857 ‘That the Reform Bill of Lord Grey was not framed in accordance with the wants of the country’, proposed by Isaac Butt and opposed by Edward Gibson. This era was considered by many to be the high point of the society, with many of its members moving to high political positions. It was common for the Members of Parliament for Dublin University to have served on the Committee of the Hist, such as Edward Gibson and David Plunkett, who were both auditors, and Edward Carson, who was the Librarian. Bram Stoker, author of Dracula, became auditor in 1872. In 1877, Charles O'Connor (judge), the last Master of the Rolls in Ireland, became auditor. In 1864 the society collected money from its members to erect statues of Edmund Burke and Oliver Goldsmith at the Front Gate of college.

The society moved to the Graduates' Memorial Building (GMB) in 1904, which it shares with the University Philosophical Society. The college board relaxed its rules, allowing such motions as ‘That the Gaelic League is deserving of the support of every Irishman’ in 1905 and 1906.

20th and 21st centuries

The society continued well through the twentieth century, although the First World War hit it badly, with 136 of its former members killed. Eoin O'Mahony was elected auditor in 1930 and faced impeachment when he raised a toast to Ireland instead of the King. Eoin O'Mahony offered Lord Carson the presidency of the society in 1931, although Carson declined due to ill health, recommending that the position be offered to former gold medallist and future President of Ireland Douglas Hyde, who was elected to the position. The current president is Prof. David McConnell, a former librarian and auditor of the society and a winner of The Irish Times Debating Competition, and now chairman of The Irish Times Trust and one of Europe's foremost geneticists.

Son of W. B. Yeats, Michael Yeats became auditor in 1944, and in that capacity organised the inaugural meeting on 'The small nations'; Taoiseach Éamon de Valera and Jan Masaryk, minister for foreign affairs in the Czechoslovakian government-in-exile in London, were his main speakers. Yeats had further involvement with the society in 1969, when it proposed admitting women members. The proposal passed by a single vote; having supported it, Yeats contended that had he stayed at home on the night of the vote the society would have remained all male.

Women had been refused membership of the society until 1969. Soon after the change in the rules, the society debated the motion ‘That this House reveres the memory of Mrs Pankhurst' with Rosaleen Mills participating (the motion, however, was defeated). The first female auditor, future Tánaiste Mary Harney, was elected in 1976.  the society has had eleven female auditors. The society's Bicentennial Meeting in 1970 was addressed by US Senator Edward Kennedy, at which he called the society "the greatest of the school of the orators" .

Later developments have seen the re-opening of the Resource Library which holds over 200 books and is made available as a general study area and library for the use of the members of the society. The society has also re-developed the 'Conversation Room' with the addition of facilities such as wireless internet access. The Conversation Room received further restoration in preparation for the 250th celebrations of the society in 2020.

Chamber debating
The main business of the society is the weekly debates held each Wednesday night during term time. The "Weekly Debate" is the second of the society's weekly meetings. In this, the internal business of the society is conducted by the general committee with an ordinary member chairing.
 
The motions debated by the society tend to be varied and wide-ranging, giving students an opportunity to debate with experts on the specific motion chosen, sometimes based on an important issue taking place in current affairs. The society has addressed several controversial issues. In 2005, over 500 people attempted to gain access to a debate on abortion which was targeted by Youth Defence protesters and a debate on euthanasia was recorded for a documentary on the pro-euthanasia group Dignitas for the Canadian Discovery Channel.

Politicians such as David Ervine, Jeffrey Donaldson and Nobel Peace Prize winner John Hume have spoken in debates on Northern Ireland. In 2005, the then Minister for Justice, Michael McDowell unveiled proposals for reform of the legal profession at a society debate on the matter. The inaugural meeting of the 236th session, in 2006, was addressed by Mary Robinson, a former President of Ireland, United Nations High Commissioner for Human Rights and Chancellor of the University of Dublin. The society has been addressed by every Taoiseach and President of Ireland.

Competitive debating
Before the creation of a competitive debating structure, representatives of the society were invited to speak at similar societies internationally. As early as 1932 James Auchmuty and Garrett Gill travelled to Moorhead to speak at Minnesota State University.

The society's best debaters compete nationally and internationally against other societies in competitions, most usually of the British Parliamentary debating style with the notable exception being the Irish Times public-speaking competition.  The society fielded teams in the Grand Final of The Irish Times Debating Competition in 2006, and won it in three consecutive years, in 2007, 2008 and 2009. It is second to the Literary and Historical Society of University College Dublin when it comes to individual and team victories. It has also competed internationally, competing at foreign Inter-Varsities and at both the World Universities Debating Championship and European Universities Debating Championships (the society having hosted the former in 1992). The society held the European record for most wins at a single European Championships, after the performance of two speakers at the 2021 Championships in Madrid.

The society jointly hosts the Trinity Women's Open, the Robert Emmett Invitational summer Open, and the Dean Swift Intervarsity (Trinity IV), the largest Irish Inter-varsity, with the University Philosophical Society. The society also fosters development and competition within itself, running workshops and internal competitions: including its Rosaleen Mills Maiden Speaker Competition, the Wolfe Tone's's Public Speaking Competition, Mary Harney Women and Gender Minorities Competition, and Henry Grattan's Historical Motion Competition.

It also plays a role in providing Secondary School Level Debating, jointly running the Leinster Schools' Debating Competition with the Literary and Historical Society and its own Schools' Maces. The Hist Schools' Mace is open to all Leaving Cert cycle student, while the Girls' Mace is open to all female and gender minority Leaving Cert Cycle students.

Controversy
In September 2020, it was reported that the society had cancelled an invitation for the author and evolutionist Richard Dawkins to address the society. In announcing the cancellation, the Auditor of the Society Bríd O’Donnell said she had been unaware Richard Dawkins held some controversial opinions, and that the society would be rescinding his invitation as we "value our members comfort above all else".

Presidents and vice-presidents

Presidents of the society since 1843

Current vice-presidents
As of 2019, the list of vice-presidents included:
 Mary Robinson,  Chancellor of the University of Dublin, former president of Ireland
 Shane Ross, ex-Record Secretary, Leader of the Independent Alliance
 Senator David Norris, Senator for the University of Dublin.
 Mary Henry, former Senator for Dublin University
 David O'Sullivan, ex-auditor, Medallist, European Union Ambassador to the United States 
 Ivana Bacik, Leader of the Labour Party, TD, former Senator for Dublin University
 Sean Barret, former Senator for the University of Dublin
 David F. Ford, ex-auditor, Regius Professor of Divinity at the University of Cambridge
 Mary Harney, 1976–77, Leader of the Progressive Democrats 1993–2006, Tánaiste 1997–2006 and Cabinet Minister 1997–2011
 Peter Charleton, ex-auditor, Judge of the Supreme Court
 Iseult O'Malley, Judge of the Supreme Court
 Richard Clarke, ex-Record Secretary, Archbishop of Armagh
 Patrick Geoghegan, author of The College Historical Society 2020 book, professor of history at TCD

Notes
A. Robert Emmett, Thomas Flynn, John Penefather Lamphier, Michael Farrall, Edward Barry, Thomas Bennett, Bernard Killen, and Patrick Fitzgerald. See various, 1892, pp. 85-88.

References

Sources

External links

1770 establishments in Ireland
Organizations established in 1770
Historical Society, College
Trinity College Dublin